= Project Marayum =

Filipino language organization

Project Marayum is a language organization by the team of computer scientists and linguists from the University of the Philippines. The term Marayum means wise words in Asi, the language of an ethnolinguistic community in Romblon. The project manages national and cultural linguistic apprehension in the Philippines in order to maintain preservation and to prevent extinction. The current head is maintained by Mario Carreon, professor at the UP Computer Science Department, and Mantha Sadural, a graduated linguistic student.
